Taylor Toth (born July 22, 1989) is an American pair skater. He is best known for his partnership with Felicia Zhang from 2009 to 2011. Together, they won the junior title at the 2010 U.S. Championships and placed ninth at the 2010 World Junior Championships.

Career
Early in his pairs career, Toth competed with Kylie Gleason. They won medals on the juvenile and intermediate levels. From 2004 through 2005, Toth competed with Molly Aaron. They competed on the 2005–2006 ISU Junior Grand Prix at two events. They are the 2005 U.S. novice pewter medalists. Their partnership ended before the 2006 U.S. Championships.

As a single skater, Toth won the junior level title at the 2007 U.S. Collegiate Championships.

Toth teamed up with Felicia Zhang in 2009. They won the junior gold medal at the 2010 U.S. Championships. They finished 9th at the 2010 World Junior Championships.

Zhang/Toth moved up to the senior level for the 2010–11 season and competed in the Grand Prix at Skate America, where they finished 7th, and Trophée Eric Bompard, where they finished 5th. They withdrew from the 2011 U.S. Championships due to Zhang's rib injuries. On March 10, 2011, Zhang and Toth announced they had parted ways. During their partnership, they were coached by Jeff DiGregorio in Newark, Delaware.

On March 23, 2012, it was announced that Toth had teamed up with Kiri Baga. In May 2014, it was announced that his partner, Kiri Baga, had decided to stop training for elite competition.

Personal life  
Toth graduated from the University of Delaware in 2011. He is active in the USFS Athlete Advisory Committee. He works for Marc Jacobs International in New York City.

Programs 
(with Zhang)

Competitive highlights

With Zhang

With Aaron

References

External links 

 
 

American male pair skaters
American male single skaters
1988 births
Living people
Sportspeople from Pittsburgh
People from Kittanning, Pennsylvania
20th-century American people
21st-century American people